Gemmiger formicilis is a bacterium from the genus Gemmiger. It was initially assigned to the "Pseudomonadota", however 16S rRNA sequencing has led to its reclassification in the Bacillota.

References

 

Eubacteriales
Bacteria described in 1975